WNJN may refer to:

 WNJN (TV), a television station (channel 50) licensed to Montclair, New Jersey, United States
 WNJN-FM, a radio station (89.7 FM) licensed to Atlantic City, New Jersey, United States